The boys' artistic gymnastics qualification at the 2018 Summer Youth Olympics was held at the America Pavilion from 7 to 10 October. The results of the qualification determined the qualifiers to the finals: 18 gymnasts in the all-around final, and 8 gymnasts in each of 6 apparatus finals.

Schedule
All times are local (UTC−3).

Results

All-around

Pommel horse

Floor exercise

Rings

Vault

Parallel bars

Horizontal bar

References

External links
Qualification results 

Boys' artistic qualification